Quebec is the second-most populated province in Canada and has a rich history of professional sports. Most professional sports teams in the province reside in Greater Montreal.

Ice hockey

Other sports

See also
Professional sports in Canada
List of professional sports teams in Canada by city

References

 
Quebec